Bon-Ton Holdings Inc. is an American online retailer and former department store chain founded  in 1898. After rapid expansion in the 1990s and early 2000s, the original company had financial troubles, ultimately filing for bankruptcy in 2018 before being sold and liquidated. In September 2018, CSC Generation began operating as an online retailer headquartered in Merrillville, Indiana, with plans to open brick and mortar locations.  In early 2021, CSC Generation sold all the acquired assets of Bon-Ton to New York-based BrandX.com, Inc in a private sale and included other brands such as Bergner's, Boston Store, Carson's, Elder-Beerman, Herberger's, and Younkers.

History

Beginnings

The Bon-Ton was started in 1898, when Max Grumbacher and his father, Samuel, opened S. Grumbacher & Son, a one-room millinery and dry goods store on Market Street in York, Pennsylvania.

As reported in the Carlisle Evening Sentinel on October 31, 1902, the store chain had two additional locations under the name "Bon-Ton Millinery" in Trenton, New Jersey, as well as in the following Pennsylvania locations: Carlisle, Lancaster, Lebanon, Altoona, and East Liverpool. The name "Bon-Ton" was drawn from a British term connoting the "elite" or "high society".

Through World War I and the Roaring Twenties, the Grumbacher's store chain grew bigger and, in 1929, the company was incorporated as S. Grumbacher & Son, Inc. In 1931, Max's son, Max Samuel (M.S.), joined the company. When Max the elder died in 1933, his widow, Daisy, and their two sons, M.S. and Richard, continued the business, forming a partnership in 1936.

The Bon-Ton was a popular store destination on the classic radio show Fibber McGee and Molly, which aired from 1935 to 1959.

Following World War II, the Grumbacher family decided to expand operations even further. In 1946, an additional Bon-Ton was opened, in Hanover, Pennsylvania. Two years later, the company moved outside Pennsylvania, acquiring Eyerly's in Hagerstown, Maryland, and, in 1957, purchasing McMeen's in Lewistown, Pennsylvania. These early moves set The Bon-Ton's policy of growing into adjacent areas by opening new stores and acquiring existing businesses.

Expansion

During the next three decades, The Bon-Ton Stores continued to expand. In 1961, M.S.'s son, M. Thomas "Tim", entered the business, representing the fourth generation of Grumbachers. During the 1960s, the company opened new Eyerly's and Bon-Ton stores in several Pennsylvania communities and one in West Virginia. In 1969, retired the McMeen's name. During the 1970s, as the popularity of shopping centers began to grow, The Bon-Ton opened 11 new stores in Pennsylvania and West Virginia.

The 1980s formed a period of rapid consolidation in the retail department store industry as major chains bought their competitors. The Bon-Ton Stores began the decade by opening more stores, establishing a new division, Maxwell's, and acquiring L S Good (including its Fowler's department stores). When Tim Grumbacher was made CEO in 1985, the company operated 18 stores in four states. Two years later, the company made a major move, buying the 11-store Pomeroy's chain from Allied Department Stores. That purchase made it possible for the company to move into seven new markets in Pennsylvania. In 1991, The Bon-Ton acquired J.W. Rhodes in Ithaca, New York. The Bon-Ton entered the Lancaster, Pennsylvania, market in 1992 with the acquisition of two Watt & Shand locations in downtown Lancaster and Park City Center. The company continued to expand its New York presence in 1993 with a store in the Wilton Mall in Saratoga Springs in the former Addis & Dey's space. In the late 1980s, the company also acquired a York, Pennsylvania family-operated department store, Mailman's from Stanley Mailman, which converted to a Bon-Ton location. 

In July 1994, The Bon-Ton purchased the 127-year-old Adam, Meldrum, and Anderson Company chain based in Buffalo, New York, for $42.6 million converting all locations to The Bon Ton. Around the same time, The Bon-Ton also purchased Chappell's of Syracuse, New York, and Hess's of Allentown, Pennsylvania.  The Bon-Ton initially retained and operated Hess's flagship location until 1996, when it closed after nearly 100 years of continuous operation. The site was eventually demolished. Its Allentown store, Hess's former south Allentown location, was the anchor of the South Mall.  In 1995, The Bon-Ton entered the Rochester, New York market in three former McCurdy's locations, as well as in a former McCurdy's space (originally Iszard's) in Elmira. In the following spring, the company opened a fourth Rochester location in a former Sibley's/Kaufmann's location. In March 1995, The Bon-Ton closed the landmark downtown Lancaster store. Later that year, they also closed the downtown AM&A's location. 1998's expansion included a new store in Westfield, Massachusetts, making it The Bon-Ton Stores' first entry into the New England area.

Operations in 2000s

In October 2003, The Bon-Ton expanded its reach into Ohio and the lower Midwest with the acquisition of the 69-store Elder-Beerman store chain.  Following an attempt to convert to a privately held company, Elder-Beerman was offered more cash for its outstanding stock as part of the buyout.  The chain operated as a separate banner until the company's demise in 2018.

On November 25, 2003, Bon-Ton reported a net loss in the third quarter of $1.7 million, or $0.11 per share, including an asset impairment charge of $0.10 per share.

The Bon-Ton Stores chain doubled in size in November 2005 with the $1.1 billion purchase of the 142 stores of Saks' Northern Department Store Group, headquartered in downtown Milwaukee, Wisconsin. Corporate headquarters remained in York, Pennsylvania, but merchandising headquarters were relocated to Milwaukee. As with the Elder-Beerman acquisition, no store names were changed in the transaction. The newly acquired store group included Carson Pirie Scott (later branded as Carson's), Bergner's, Boston Store, Herberger's, and Younkers.

In September 2006, The Bon-Ton purchased four former Parisian stores (plus one under construction) from Belk (which had just purchased the chain); the stores were located in Michigan, Indiana, and Ohio (outside Belk's traditional operating territory). The stores in Indiana and Ohio were immediately rebranded to Carson Pirie Scott and Elder-Beerman, respectively. The three Michigan stores maintained the Parisian name until 2013, when they were rebranded to Carson's.

Final years

The Bon-Ton's final years were marked with a string of financial losses and executive turnover.

From 2011 through 2017, the company did not post an annual profit. From 2011 through the company's bankruptcy, it had four CEOs and three CFOs. In December 2013, Mike Nemoir, senior vice-president, announced he would retire after four decades in the fashion industry at Bon-Ton and its predecessor companies on March 28, 2014. In May 2017, Tim Grumbacher retired after 50 years on the board of directors, and more than 25 as its chairman. He had also been Bon-Ton's CEO from 1985 to 1995 and held other senior management positions. Grumbacher's wife and fellow board member, Debra Simon, was elected to succeed him.

In fall 2016, Bon-Ton launched in-store and online "Close to Home" shops in 45 of its stores, selling locally sourced and locally themed products. In February 2017, the chain announced that it would expand these shops to at least 100 stores in 25 states and would partner with local designers, artisans and entrepreneurs in each market interested in selling their products in these shops.

The company's financial situation worsened rapidly in 2017, with same-store sales falling over 6% in both the second and third quarters. On May 5, 2017, Bon-Ton Stores was informed its common stock was no longer in compliance with NASDAQ listing requirements, and the stock was de-listed from the exchange on December 6 and became listed in OTC Pink.  In November 2017, the company announced a store closure program, stating 40 to 45 stores would close after the holiday season.

Bankruptcy and liquidation
During the first quarter of 2018, The Bon-Ton announced it would be closing 42 stores in 14 states, in addition to five stores previously announced. However, it was not enough to save the company from its large debt.

On December 18, 2017, Bon-Ton Stores revealed it had failed to pay $14 million in interest that had been due December 15. The company entered into a grace period with its lenders. Analysis from Standard & Poor's downgraded the company into selective default, and predicted a bankruptcy or out-of-court restructuring at the conclusion of the grace period.

In February 2018, The Bon-Ton Stores Inc. filed for Chapter 11 bankruptcy protection. The company had not made an annual profit since 2010.

On April 9, 2018, it was announced that Washington Prime Group and Namdar Realty Group would bid to save Bon-Ton from bankruptcy. On April 17, 2018, however, the plans fell through because the court ruled the company would not be able to pay a $500,000 "work fee".

On April 17, 2018, The Bon-Ton announced it would liquidate all 267 stores after The Great American Group LLC and Tiger Capitol Group LLC bid $775.5 million for the retailer and after converting its Chapter 11 bankruptcy to Chapter 7. They acquired the inventory and other assets of the company and sold it all off. On August 30, Great America Group said all Pennsylvania locations were officially closed, and buildings would be vacated by the next day.

Revival and relaunch
On August 31, 2018, The Bon-Ton Stores, Inc.-owned retail websites were updated with "Stay Tuned" messages, indicating that the company's respective brands would come back in some form; the liquidator stated that the company's intellectual property was being sold. On September 6, 2018, it was reported that the purchaser was Merrillville, Indiana-based CSC Generation, a holding company backed by Chinese and American venture capital firms, which owns the membership buying service DirectBuy. CSC Generation agreed to pay $900,000 for Bon-Ton's database of 24.5 million unique customer records and 5.6 million email addresses, as well as its trademarks and websites. While the retailer would become a smaller e-commerce business focused on its website, there were plans to reopen some physical stores in several states. However, only one such store was re-opened (in Evergreen Park, Illinois), and it closed in 2020. Also, beauty products company L'Oréal USA successfully bid $312,900 for data on Bon-Ton's cosmetics and fragrance customers. On September 10, 2018, the federal bankruptcy judge approved the sale to CSC Generation; on September 14, the new owner relaunched websites for all of its department store brands. In addition to apparel and home goods, the websites also sold televisions and major kitchen appliances.

Subsequently, in early 2021, CSC Generation sold all the acquired assets of Bon-Ton to New York-based BrandX.com, Inc in a private sale. According to a May 2022 article on WWD, BrandX will relaunch Bon-Ton online, and open a physical Carson's store in Illinois. 

In September 2022 The Bon-Ton relaunched online as the first brand relaunch by BrandX.com

See also
 Retail apocalypse
 List of retailers affected by the retail apocalypse

References

External links
 Official website

1898 establishments in Pennsylvania
American companies established in 1898
Companies that filed for Chapter 11 bankruptcy in 2018
Companies that have filed for Chapter 7 bankruptcy
Defunct department stores based in Indiana
Defunct department stores based in Pennsylvania
Economy of the Midwestern United States
Merrillville, Indiana
Online retailers of the United States
Privately held companies based in Indiana
Retail companies established in 1898
Re-established companies